The 2017 LPGA of Japan Tour was the 50th season of the LPGA of Japan Tour, the professional golf tour for women operated by the Ladies Professional Golfers' Association of Japan. The 2017 schedule included 38 official events worth ¥3.710 billion.

The leading money winner was Ai Suzuki, followed by Lee Min-young and Teresa Lu. Suzuki finished also on top of the LPGA Mercedes-Benz Player of the Year Rankings, here followed by Kim Ha-neul and Lee Min-young.

Schedule
The number in parentheses after winners' names show the player's total number wins in official money individual events on the LPGA of Japan Tour, including that event. All tournaments were played in Japan.

Events in bold are majors.
The Toto Japan Classic is co-sanctioned with the LPGA Tour.

External links
 

LPGA of Japan Tour
LPGA of Japan Tour
LPGA of Japan Tour